This is a list of all seasons played by RK Zamet in national and European handball, from 1957 to the most recent completed season.

Key

League
P = Games played
W = Games won
D = Games drawn
L = Games lost
GF = Goals for
GA = Goals against
Pts = Points
Pos = Final position
N/A = Not available or applicable

Results

League results (1957-present)

Cup Results (1992-present)

Zamet II league results

Tournaments

Youth tournaments

Honours

Croatia 
Croatian Premier Handball League 
Runner-up (1): 1992
Third (2): 1997-98, 1998-99
Croatian Handball Cup
Runner-up (3): 2000, 2001, 2012
Croatian Second Handball League (1): 1995-96

Yugoslavia 
Yugoslav Second League (2): 1977–78, 1986–87
Runner-up (2): 1979-80, 1983-84

Yugoslav Third League (1): 1976-77
Regional League (3): 1965–66, 1969–70, 1970–71
Runner-up (2): 1964-65, 1967-68, 1971-72

Croatian Handball Champion (1): 1977

Zamet II
3. HRL - West (2): 2004–05, 2011–12

Youth 
Croatian Handball Championship U-19 (2): 1990, 1996
Croatian Handball Championship U-18 
Runner-up (1): 2008
Third (1): 1994
Croatian Handball Championship U-16 (1): 2016
Croatian Handball Championship U-14 (3): 1969, 1974, 1981

References
http://www.eurohandball.com/ec/ehfc/men/2012-13/clubs/004346/HC+Zamet
Petar Orgulić - 50 godina rukometa u Rijeci (2005.)

RK Zamet